The Scottish Premiership (referred to as the Tennents Premiership for sponsorship reasons) is an amateur league competition for Scottish rugby union clubs. First held in 1973, it is the top division of the Scottish League Championship. The most recent (2019) champions are Ayr, while the most successful club is Hawick, who have won the competition twelve times.

Ten clubs contest the league, with the bottom club relegated to the Scottish National League Division One and second-bottom club involved in a play-off.

The top level of club rugby in Scotland are the two professional teams – Glasgow Warriors and Edinburgh Rugby – that play in the United Rugby Championship. They assign their players to the clubs below in a Pro-Draft; so that they can still play when not used by the professional sides. From season 2019–20 a semi-professional championship in Scotland, known as the Super 6, was introduced – its teams no longer taken part in the Premiership competition. The Super 6 format is intended to bridge the gap between the amateur grade and the professional United Rugby Championship teams.

History

Up to season 1972–73, Scotland's rugby union clubs participated in what was known as the Scottish Unofficial Championship. It provided very unbalanced competition: some clubs played more fixtures than others and some fixture lists provided stiffer opposition than others. The resulting league table at the end of each season gave a very unbalanced and difficult-to-comprehend set of results.

Starting in season 1973–74, the Scottish Rugby Union organised the full member clubs into six leagues. This suited some of the 'open' clubs but many of the older former pupils clubs found it difficult to compete successfully and were forced into going 'open' themselves to try to recruit some of the better players. Those that didn't declined. Open clubs kept their old FP or Academical name, and still played on grounds owned by the schools. In the first 14 seasons of league rugby the Division I championship was won by Hawick on ten occasions.

One consequence was soon apparent: fewer players were selected from English clubs to represent Scotland. For the first time since before the First World War, the domestic game was producing an adequate number of players of genuine international class. Though the SRU's administrators were often seen as backward looking, Scotland had a national league before England, Wales or Ireland.

Heriot's FP became the first city club to win the championship, they had already attracted "outsiders"; their leading try-scorer was Bill Gammell, a Fettesian already capped for the Scotland national rugby union team while playing for Edinburgh Wanderers. League rugby drew the crowds, and the 20 years that followed its introduction were the best in the history of Scottish club rugby. In that period the title of champions rarely went out of the Borders: with Hawick, Gala and Melrose enjoying long periods of ascendancy. Recently, however, the Borders domination has faded and Glasgow Hawks won the title three times in successive years between 2003 and 2004 and 2005–06.

Since the advent of the leagues, the Scottish Rugby Union and its member clubs have re-organised the competition several times, usually to change the number of teams.

The top Scottish clubs qualified to the British and Irish Cup from 2009 to 2014.

Competition format
Each of the 10 clubs play each other at home and away between August and January, resulting in 18 games played by each club. Four points are awarded for a win, two for a draw and zero for a loss. Bonus points are also on offer in each game – one for scoring four or more tries and the other for the losing club finishing within seven points of the winning club.

Play-off
From season 2014–15 an end of season play-off was introduced for the top four clubs in the table. These clubs take part in a knock-out competition, with first playing third and second playing fourth in a semi-final match at the home venue of the highest finishing clubs. The winners then face each other in the final to determine the Premiership champion.

Promotion and Relegation
The 10th-placed club is relegated to Scottish National League Division One and replaced by the winners of National League Division One. The 9th-placed club takes part in a play-off match at a neutral venue with the 2nd-placed club in National League Division One. Although the Super 6 established in 2019 is above the Premiership in the national hierarchy and its clubs were selected directly from the existing members, as of 2021 its format was a 'closed shop' with no movement of teams between the Super 6 and the Premiership.

2021–22 Clubs

Clubs remained the same as the 2019–20 season, due to the COVID-19 pandemic
Marr (1st)
Jed-Forest (2nd)
Glasgow Hutchesons Aloysians (3rd)
Aberdeen GSFP (4th)
Selkirk (5th)
Musselburgh (6th)

The six clubs selected for the Super 6 competition are no longer members of the Premiership – these comprise 2019 winners Ayr, prominent Edinburgh clubs Boroughmuir, Heriot's and Watsonians, Borderers Melrose, plus Stirling County. Those clubs have won many of the championships over the years (see below), although Hawick, Currie and Glasgow Hawks have also been winners during the 21st century – more recently than Watsonians or Stirling who both spent time in the lower divisions and have only won one national title each.

Past winners

Hawick
Hawick
Hawick
Hawick
Hawick
Heriot's
Gala
Gala
Hawick
Gala
Hawick
Hawick
Hawick
Hawick
Kelso
Kelso
Melrose
Boroughmuir
Melrose
Melrose
Melrose
Stirling County
Melrose
Melrose
Watsonians
Heriot's
Heriot's
Hawick
Hawick
Boroughmuir
Glasgow Hawks
Glasgow Hawks
Glasgow Hawks
Currie
Boroughmuir
Ayr
Currie
Melrose
Melrose
Ayr
Melrose
Heriot's
Heriot's
Ayr
Melrose
Ayr
Season Null and Void
Cancelled
Marr
Hawick

References

2
1973 establishments in Scotland
Scotland
Sports leagues established in 1973